Dark Water Rising is a Native American group featuring an Indie rock/Blues sound. Based in Robeson County, North Carolina, they formed in 2010 and won the 2010 Native American Music Award for "Debut Duo or Group of the Year". In 2011 they gained two nominations in the Aboriginal Peoples Choice Awards, Single of the Year for their song Hooked and Best Folk/Acoustic CD for their debut album Dark Water Rising. The band tours regularly in North Carolina and across the east coast, and was featured on the nationally broadcast NPR show The Story with Dick Gordon. Members of Dark Water Rising belong to the Lumbee and Coharie tribes of North Carolina.

Discography

Band members

(Current members)
 Charly Lowry - Lead Vocals and rhythm guitar
 Aaron Locklear- Drums / Percussion
 Corey Locklear - Guitar 
 Zack Hargett - Bass 
(Past members)
 Tony murnahan|Tony Murnahan - Bass and guitar
 Shay Jones - Drums & Percussion and backing vocals
 Ciera Dial Locklear- Keyboard and vocals
 Brittany Jacobs- Saxophone, percussion and vocals
 Eric Locklear- Bass guitar
 Emily Musolino - Lead Vocals and electric guitar

Awards and nominations
Native American Music Awards (NAMA/NAMMYS):
             Won: • Best Inspirational Recording (2014) for "Grace and Grit Chapter I"
                  • Debut Duo or Group of the Year (2010)

             Nominated: • Single of the Year (2011) for Hometown Hero

Aboriginal People's Choice Awards:
Nominated: Single of the Year (2011) for Hooked
Nominated: Best Folk/Acoustic CD (2011) for Dark Water Rising

References

External links
 Dark Water Rising - Official Homepage
 Dark Water Rising - Facebook Page

21st-century Native Americans
Lumbee people
Musical groups from North Carolina
Native American musical groups